John Hurley (19 January 1884 – 14 July 1972) was an Australian rules footballer who played with Geelong in the Victorian Football League (VFL).

Notes

External links 

1884 births
1972 deaths
Australian rules footballers from Geelong
Geelong Football Club players